Sheikh Ishaaq bin Ahmed bin Muhammad bin Hussein al-Hashimi, more commonly known as Sheikh Ishaaq or Sheikh Isaaq was the Sayyid forefather of the Somali Isaaq clan-family in the Horn of Africa, whose traditional territory is wide and densely populated.

Sheikh Ishaaq purportedly traveled from Yemen to Somaliland in the 12th or 13th century, where he is supposed to have married into the Somali Dir clan. He is said to have settled in what is today the Erigavo District, and to have established his capital at Maydh. The stories surrounding Sheikh Ishaaq have played an important role in establishing and reinforcing the Arab and Muslim identity of the Isaaq clan.

Migrations 

Traditional hagiologies of the Isaaq clan describe how Sheikh Isaaq first made a series of travels through Arabia, before sailing to the ancient Somali port of Zeila and continuing his travels through Somaliland and some regions of Ethiopia, finally settling in Maydh. These stories, as detailed below, are more akin to myths than to history, although they do probably reflect a historical settlement of Arab immigrants in medieval Somaliland.

Early life 

After the death of Sheikh Ishaaq's grandfather he went on a series of migrations in order to study further and preach Islam. He first preached in Mecca and then travelled to Egypt, and hence to Eritrea and Zeila. He then later settled in the area of Saba' in modern-day Yemen where he married the sister of the king of the Al Haqar clan. She bore him two sons; Dir'an and Shareef, whose descendants are the Al Dir'an and Al-Ashraf clans respectively. Sheikh Ishaaq later settled in the Al-Jawf region in northern Yemen where he married once again and had a son, Mansur, who is the forefather of the Al Mansur clan in the Al-Jawf region. He then travelled to Yaba where he married and had a son, Yusuf, who is the forefather of the Al Yusuf clan based in Yaba and Ma'rib regions.

Arrival in the Horn of Africa 
Sheikh Ishaaq then continued his journey and migrated to Zeila, Somaliland and finally Harar in Ethiopia. Several accounts indicate Shaykh Yusuf al Kownayn and Sheikh Isaaq were known to be contemporaries in Zeila and in contact at the same time. According to a popular legend, Shaykh Yusuf al Kownayn, known locally as Aw-Barkhadle, upon meeting Sheikh Ishaaq prophesied that Sheikh Ishaaq would be blessed by Allah with many children while Shaykh Yusuf would not have descendants. According to the prophecy the descendants of Sheikh Ishaaq would also visit Aw-Barkhadle's grave and pay respect and perform siyaaro, or pilgrimage to his tomb. Saints and Somalis: popular Islam in a clan-based society states:

Since, however, Aw Barkhadle’s precise connection with the rulers of Ifat is not widely known, he appears as an isolated figure, and in comparison with the million or so spears of the Isaaq lineage, a saint deprived of known issue. The striking difference between these two saints is explained in a popular legend, according to which, when Sheikh Isaaq and Aw Barkhadle met, the latter prophesied that Isaaq would be blessed by God with many children. He, however, would not have descendants, but Isaaq’s issue would pay him respect and siyaaro (voluntary offerings). So it is, one is told, that every year the Isaaq clansmen gather at Aw Barkhadle’s shrine to make offerings in his name.

After studying and proselytizing in Harar he then undertook the pilgrimage to Mecca, came back to Somaliland and went along the shore eastward to the coastal town of Maydh in eastern Somaliland, where he converted the pagan peoples to Islam. He later settled in the town aged 60, where he married two women; one of the Magaadle Dir tribe called Magaado, and a Harari woman called Xiis Xaniifa, the daughter of a Harari emir, with descendants belonging to the Habar Magaadle or Habar Habusheed branches respectively. He sired eight sons who are the common ancestors of the clans of the Isaaq clan-family. He remained in Maydh until his death.

Lineage 
Most Arabic hagiologies are in agreement when it comes to the lineage of Sheikh Ishaaq, tracing his lineage to Ali bin Abi Talib, the cousin and son-in-law of the Islamic prophet Muhammad. However, according to I.M Lewis, the long genealogy which members of the Isaaq clan trace their lineage through, given the preponderance of names belonging to early Islamic Arabia (i.e., the time of the prophet Muhammad) rather than to medieval Somali-Arab culture, is very unlikely to be genuine. I.M Lewis further elaborates that the genealogy is apparently 'Arabicized' with the goal of enhancing the prestige of the Isaaq among the many ethnic groups in modern and contemporary Somalia.

The lineage attributed to Sheikh Ishaaq by two Arabic hagiologies, and which is covered by Alessandro Gori in Studi sulla letteratura agiografica islamica somala in lingua araba, is the following;

Ash-Shaykh Ishaaq bin Ahmad bin Muhammad bin Husayn bin Ali bin Hamza al-Mudhahar bin Abdallah bin Ayyub bin Muhammad bin Qasim bin Ahmad bin Yahya bin Isa bin Ali bin Hasan Al-Askari Al-Khalis bin Ja’far bin Ali al-Hadi bin Muhammad al-Jawad bin Ali al-Ridha bin Musa al-Kadhim bin Ja'far al-Sadiq bin Muhammad al-Baqir bin Ali Zayn Al-Abidin bin Husayn bin Ali bin Abi Talib.

Descendants 

In the Isaaq clan-family, component clans are divided into two uterine divisions, as shown in the genealogy. The first division is between those lineages descended from sons of Sheikh Ishaaq by a Harari woman – the Habr Habusheed – and those descended from sons of Sheikh Ishaaq by a Somali woman of the Magaadle sub-clan of the Dir – the Habr Magaadle. Indeed, most of the largest clans of the clan-family are in fact uterine alliances hence the matronymic "Habr" which in archaic Somali means "mother". This is illustrated in the following clan structure.
A. Habr Magaadle

 Ismail (Garhajis)
 Ayub
 Muhammad (Arap)
 Abdirahman (Habr Awal)

B. Habr Habuusheed

 Ahmed (Tol Je’lo)
 Muuse (Habr Je'lo)
 Ibrahiim (Sanbuur)
 Muhammad (‘Ibraan)

There is clear agreement on the clan and sub-clan structures that has not changed for a long time. The oldest recorded genealogy of a Somali in Western literature was by Sir Richard Burton in the mid–19th century regarding his Isaaq (Habr Yunis) host and the governor of Zeila, Sharmarke Ali Saleh.

The following listing is taken from the World Bank's Conflict in Somalia: Drivers and Dynamics from 2005 and the United Kingdom's Home Office publication, Somalia Assessment 2001.

 Isaaq
 Habr Awal
 Sacad Muuse
 Issa Musse
 Garhajis
 Habr Yunis
 Eidagale
 Arap
 Ayub
 Habr Je'lo
 Muuse Abokor
 Mohamed Abokor
 Samane Abokor
 Tol Je'lo
 Sanbuur
 Imraan

One tradition maintains that Sheikh Ishaaq had twin sons: Muhammad (Arap), and Ismail (Garhajis). In addition, Sheikh Ishaaq had four additional sons in Yemen (Dir'an, Shareef, Yusuf and Mansur) whose descendants inhabit parts of northern Yemen, including the Khawlan district and the Ma'rib governorate.

In one exemplified folklore tale, Sheikh Ishaaq's three eldest sons split their father's inheritance among themselves. Garhajis receives his imama, a symbol of leadership; Awal receives the sheikh's wealth; and Ahmed (Tolja'ele) inherits his sword. The story is intended to depict the Garhajis' alleged proclivity for politics, the Habr Awal's mercantile prowess, and the Habr Je'lo's bellicosity.

To strengthen these clan stereotypes, historical anecdotes have been used: The Habar Yonis allegedly dominated positions as interpreters for the British during the colonial period, and thus acquired pretensions to intellectual and political superiority; Habr Awal dominance of the trade via Djibouti and Berbera is practically uncontested; and Habr Je’lo military prowess is cited in accounts of previous conflicts.

Legacy 
According to genealogical books and Somali tradition, the Isaaq clan was founded in the 13th or 14th century with the arrival Sheikh Ishaaq from Arabia in Maydh. He settled in the coastal town of Maydh in modern-day northeastern Somaliland, where he married into the local Magaadle clan.

There are also numerous existing hagiologies in Arabic which describe Sheikh Ishaaq's travels, works and overall life in modern Somaliland, as well as his movements in Arabia before his arrival. Besides historical sources, one of the more recent printed biographies of Sheikh Ishaaq is the Amjaad of Sheikh Husseen bin Ahmed Darwiish al-Isaaqi as-Soomaali, which was printed in Aden in 1955.

His descendants would later on form two powerful sultanates that would later on dominate the northern coastline of the Horn of Africa during the early modern era; the Isaaq sultanate and the Habr Yunis sultanate.

As part of the modern attempts to 'Arabicize' the genealogy of the Isaaq, Sheikh Isaaq's lineage has been traced by hagiologists to Ali ibn Abi Talib, the cousin and son-in-law of the prophet Muhammad. This lineage is likely false, and mainly serves to stress the Muslim background of Somali culture.

Tomb 
Sheikh Ishaaq's tomb is in Maydh, and is the scene of frequent pilgrimages. Sheikh Ishaaq's mawlid (birthday) is also celebrated every Thursday with a public reading of his manaaqib (a collection of glorious deeds). His siyaara or pilgrimage is performed annually both within Somaliland and in the diaspora particularly in the Middle East among Isaaq expatriates. The tomb was kept by the family of Somali artist Abdullahi Qarshe.

Murray in his book The Journal of the Royal Geographical Society notes that many men from the western Isaaq clans would travel to Maydh to spend the last years of their lives in hopes of being buried near Sheikh Ishaaq. The book states:

References 

Legendary progenitors
12th-century deaths
13th-century deaths
Year of death unknown
12th-century Arabs
13th-century Arabs